The Agamas (Devanagari: ,) are a collection of several Tantric literature and scriptures of Hindu schools. The term literally means tradition or "that which has come down", and the Agama texts describe cosmology, epistemology, philosophical doctrines, precepts on meditation and practices, four kinds of yoga, mantras, temple construction, deity worship and ways to attain sixfold desires. These canonical texts are in Tamil and Sanskrit. Agamas were predominant in South India but Sanskritized later.

The three main branches of Agama texts are Shaiva, Vaishnava, and Shakta. The Agamic traditions are sometimes called Tantrism, although the term "Tantra" is usually used specifically to refer to Shakta Agamas. The Agama literature is voluminous, and includes 28 Shaiva Agamas, 64 Shakta Agamas (also called Tantras), and 108 Vaishnava Agamas (also called Pancharatra Samhitas), and numerous Upa-Agamas.

The origin and chronology of Agamas is unclear. Some are Vedic and others non-Vedic. Agama traditions include Yoga and Self Realization concepts, some include Kundalini Yoga, asceticism, and philosophies ranging from Dvaita (dualism) to Advaita (monism). Some suggest that these are post-Vedic texts, others as pre-Vedic compositions dating back to over 1100 BCE. Epigraphical and archaeological evidence suggests that Agama texts were in existence by about middle of the 1st millennium CE, in the Pallava dynasty era.

Scholars note that some passages in the Hindu Agama texts appear to repudiate the authority of the Vedas, while other passages assert that their precepts reveal the true spirit of the Vedas. The Agamas literary genre may also be found in Śramaṇic traditions (i.e. Buddhist, Jaina, etc.). Bali Hindu tradition is officially called Agama Hindu Dharma in Indonesia.

Etymology
Āgama (Sanskrit आगम) is derived from the verb root गम् (gam) meaning "to go" and the preposition आ (ā) meaning "toward" and refers to scriptures as "that which has come down".

Agama literally means "tradition", and refers to precepts and doctrines that have come down as tradition. Agama, states Dhavamony, is also a "generic name of religious texts which are at the basis of Hinduism and which are divided into Vaishnava Agamas (also called Pancaratra Samhitas), Shaiva Agamas, and Shakta Agamas (more often called Tantras).

Significance

Agamas, states Rajeshwari Ghose, teach a system of spirituality involving ritual worship and ethical personal conduct through precepts of a god. The means of worship in the Agamic religions differs from the Vedic form. While the Vedic form of yajna requires no idols and shrines, the Agamic religions are based on idols with puja as a means of worship. Symbols, icons and temples are a necessary part of the Agamic practice, while non-theistic paths are alternative means of Vedic practice. Action and will drive Agama precepts, while knowledge is salvation in Vedic precepts. This, however, does not necessarily mean that Agamas and Vedas are opposed, according to medieval-era Hindu theologians. Tirumular, for example, explained their link as follows: "the Vedas are the path, and the Agamas are the horse".

Each Agama consists of four parts:
 Jnana pada, also called Vidya pada – consists of doctrine, the philosophical and spiritual knowledge, knowledge of reality and liberation.
 Yoga pada – precepts on yoga, the physical and mental discipline.
 Kriya pada – consists of rules for rituals, construction of temples (Mandir); design principles for sculpting, carving, and consecration of idols of deities for worship in temples; for different forms of initiations or diksha. This code is analogous to those in Puranas and in the Buddhist text of Sadhanamala.
 Charya pada – lays down rules of conduct, of worship (puja), observances of religious rites, rituals, festivals and prayaschittas.

The Agamas state three requirements for a place of pilgrimage: Sthala, Tirtha, and Murti. Sthala refers to the place of the temple, Tīrtha is the temple tank, and Murti refers to the image of god (usually an idol of a deity).

Elaborate rules are laid out in the Agamas for Silpa (the art of sculpture) describing the quality requirements of the places where temples are to be built, the kind of images to be installed, the materials from which they are to be made, their dimensions, proportions, air circulation, lighting in the temple complex, etc. The Manasara and Silpasara are some of the works dealing with these rules. The rituals followed in worship services each day at the temple also follow rules laid out in the Agamas.

Philosophy

The Agama texts of Hinduism present a diverse range of philosophies, ranging from theistic dualism to absolute monism. This diversity of views was acknowledged in Chapter36 of Tantraloka by the 10th-century scholar Abhinavagupta. In Shaivism alone, there are ten dualistic (dvaita) Agama texts, eighteen qualified monism-cum-dualism (bhedabheda) Agama texts, and sixty-four monism (advaita) Agama texts. The Bhairava Shastras are monistic, while Shiva Shastras are dualistic.

A similar breadth of diverse views is present in Vaishnava Agamas as well. The Agama texts of Shaiva and Vaishnava schools are premised on existence of Atman (soul, self) and the existence of an Ultimate Reality (Brahman – called Shiva in Shaivism, and Vishnu in Vaishnavism). The texts differ in the relation between the two. Some assert the dualistic philosophy of the individual soul and Ultimate Reality being different, while others state a Oneness between the two. Kashmir Shaiva Agamas posit absolute oneness, that is God (Shiva) is within man, God is within every being, God is present everywhere in the world including all non-living beings, and there is no spiritual difference between life, matter, man and God. The parallel group among Vaishnavas are the Shuddhadvaitins (pure Advaitins).
 
Scholars from both schools have written treatises ranging from dualism to monism. For example, Shivagrayogin has emphasized the non-difference or unity of being (between the Atman and Shivam), which is realized through stages which include rituals, conduct, personal discipline and the insight of spiritual knowledge. This bears a striking similarity, states Soni, to Shankara, Madhva and Ramanujan Vedantic discussions.

Relation to the Vedas and Upanishads

The Vedas and Upanishads are common scriptures of Hinduism, states Dhavamony, while the Agamas are sacred texts of specific sects of Hinduism. The surviving Vedic literature can be traced to the 1st millennium BCE and earlier, while the surviving Agamas can be traced to 1st millennium of the common era. The Vedic literature, in Shaivism, is primary and general, while Agamas are special treatise. In terms of philosophy and spiritual precepts, no Agama that goes against the Vedic literature, states Dhavamony, will be acceptable to the Shaivas. Similarly, the Vaishnavas treat the Vedas along with the Bhagavad Gita as the main scripture, and the Samhitas (Agamas) as exegetical and exposition of the philosophy and spiritual precepts therein. The Shaktas have a similar reverence for the Vedic literature and view the Tantras (Agamas) as the fifth Veda.

The heritage of the Agamas, states Krishna Shivaraman, was the "Vedic piety maturing in the monism of the Upanishads presenting the ultimate spiritual reality as Brahman and the way to realizing as portrayed in the Gita".

Texts

Shaiva Agamas
The Shaiva Agamas are found in four main schools: Kapala, Kalamukha, Pashupata and Shaiva, and number 28 in total as follows:

 Kamikam
 Yogajam
 Chintyam
 Karanam
 Ajitham
 Deeptham
 Sukskmam
 Sahasram
 Ashuman
 Suprabedham
 Vijayam
 Nishwasam
 Swayambhuvam
 Analam
 Veeram
 Rouravam
 Makutam
 Vimalam
 Chandragnanam
 Bimbam
 Prodgeetham
 Lalitham
 Sidham
 Santhanam
 Sarvoktham
 Parameshwaram
 Kiranam
 Vathulam

Saiva Siddhanta

The Shaiva Agamas led to the Shaiva Siddhanta philosophy in Tamil-speaking regions of South-India, which arose from Kashmir Saivism in the Upmost North-Indian region of Kashmir Valley.

Kashmiri Shaivism
The Agamas of Kashmiri Shaivism is also called the Trika Shastra. It centers mainly on the Trika system of mAlinI, siddha and nAmaka Agamas and venerates the triad Shiva, Shakti, Nara (the bound soul) and the union of Shiva with Shakti. The trika philosophy derives its name from the three shaktis, namely, parA, aparA and parApara; and provides three modes of knowledge of reality, that is, non-dual (abheda), non-dual-cum-dual (bhedabheda) and dual (bheda). The literature of Kashmiri Shaivism is divided under three categories: Agama shastra, Spanda shastra, and Pratyabhijna shastra. Although the Trika Shastra in the form of Agama Shastra is said to have existed eternally, the founder of the system is considered Vasugupta (850 AD) to whom the Shiva Sutras were revealed. Kallata in Spanda-vritti and Kshemaraja in his commentary Vimarshini state Shiva revealed the secret doctrines to Vasugupta while Bhaskara in his Varttika says a Siddha revealed the doctrines to Vasugupta in a dream.

Shakta Agamas

The Shakta Agamas are commonly known as Tantras, and they are imbued with reverence for the feminine, representing goddess as the focus and treating the female as equal and essential part of the cosmic existence. The feminine Shakti (literally, energy and power) concept is found in the Vedic literature, but it flowers into extensive textual details only in the Shakta Agamas. These texts emphasize the feminine as the creative aspect of a male divinity, cosmogonic power and all pervasive divine essence. The theosophy, states Rita Sherma, presents the masculine and feminine principle in a "state of primordial, transcendent, blissful unity". The feminine is the will, the knowing and the activity, she is not only the matrix of creation, she is creation. Unified with the male principle, in these Hindu sect's Tantra texts, the female is the Absolute.

The Shakta Agamas are related to the Shaiva Agamas, with their respective focus on Shakti with Shiva in Shakta Tantra and on Shiva in Shaiva texts. DasGupta states that the Shiva and Shakti are "two aspects of the same truth – static and dynamic, transcendent and immanent, male and female", and neither is real without the other, Shiva's dynamic power is Shakti and she has no existence without him, she is the highest truth and he the manifested essence.

The Shakta Agamas or Shakta tantras are 64 in number. Some of the older Tantra texts in this genre are called Yamalas, which literally denotes, states Teun Goudriaan, the "primeval blissful state of non-duality of Shiva and Shakti, the ultimate goal for the Tantric Sadhaka".

Vaishnava Agamas

The Vaishnava Agamas are found into two main schoolsPancharatra and Vaikhanasas. While Vaikhanasa Agamas were transmitted from Vikhanasa Rishi to his disciples Brighu, Marichi, Atri and Kashyapa, the Pancharatra Agamas are classified into three: Divya (from Vishnu), Munibhaashita (from Muni, sages), and Aaptamanujaprokta (from sayings of trustworthy men).

Vaikhanasa Agama

Maharishi Vikhanasa is considered to have guided in the compilation of a set of Agamas named Vaikhānasa Agama. Sage Vikhanasa is conceptualized as a mind-born creation, i.e., Maanaseeka Utbhavar of Lord Narayana. Originally Vikhanasa passed on the knowledge to nine disciples in the first manvantara -- Atri, Bhrigu, Marichi, Kashyapa, Vasishta, Pulaha, Pulasthya, Krathu and Angiras. However, only those of Bhrigu, Marichi, Kashyapa and Atri are extant today. The four rishis are said to have received the cult and knowledge of Vishnu from the first Vikahansa, i.e., the older Brahma in the Svayambhuva Manvanthara. Thus, the four sages Atri, Bhrigu, Marichi, Kashyapa, are considered the propagators of vaikhānasa śāstra. A composition of Sage Vikhanasa's disciple Marichi, namely, Ananda-Samhita states  Vikhanasa prepared the Vaikhanasa Sutra according to a branch of Yajurveda and was Brahma himself.

The extant texts of vaikhānasa Agama number 28 in total and are known from the texts, vimānārcakakalpa and ānanda saṃhitā, both composed by marīci which enumerate them. They are:

The 13 Adhikaras authored by Bhrigu are khilatantra, purātantra, vāsādhikāra, citrādhikāra, mānādhikāra, kriyādhikāra, arcanādhikāra, yajnādhikāra, varṇādhikāra, prakīrnṇādhikāra, pratigrṛhyādhikāra, niruktādhikāra, khilādhikāra. However, ānanda saṃhitā attributes ten works to Bhrigu, namely, khila, khilādhikāra, purādhikāra, vāsādhikāraṇa, arcanādhikaraṇa, mānādhikaraṇa, kriyādhikāra, niruktādhikāra, prakīrnṇādhikāra, yajnādhikāra.

The 8 Samhitas authored by Mareechi are Jaya saṃhitā, Ananda saṃhitā, Saṃjnāna saṃhitā, Vīra saṃhitā, Vijaya saṃhitā, Vijita saṃhitā, Vimala saṃhitā, Jnāna saṃhitā. However, ānanda saṃhitā attributes the following works to Marichi—jaya saṃhitā, ānanda saṃhitā, saṃjnāna saṃhitā, vīra saṃhitā, vijaya saṃhitā, vijita saṃhitā, vimala saṃhitā, kalpa saṃhitā.

The 3 Kandas authored by Kashyapa are Satyakāṇḍa, Tarkakāṇḍa, Jnānakāṇḍa. However, Ananda Saṃhitā attributes the satyakāṇḍa, karmakāṇḍa and jnānakāṇḍa to Kashyapa.

The 4 tantras authored by Atri are Pūrvatantra, Atreyatantra, Viṣṇutantra, Uttaratantra. However, Ananda Saṃhitā attributes the pūrvatantra, viṣṇutantra, uttaratantra and mahātantra to Atri.

Pancharatra Agama

Like the Vaikhanasa Agama, the Pancharatra Agama, the Viswanatha Agama is centered around the worship of Lord Vishnu. While the Vaikhansa deals primarily with Vaidhi Bhakti, the Pancharatra Agama teaches both vaidhi and Raganuga bhakti.

Soura Agamas
The Soura or Saura Agamas comprise one of the six popular agama-based religions of Shaiva, Vaishnava, Shakta, Ganapatya, Kaumara and Soura. The Saura Tantras are dedicated to the sun (Surya) and Soura Agamas are in use in temples of Sun worship.

Ganapatya Agamas
The Paramanada Tantra mentions the number of sectarian tantras as 6000 for Vaishnava, 10000 for Shaiva, 100000 for Shakta, 1000 for Ganapatya, 2000 for Saura, 7000 for Bhairava, and 2000 for Yaksha-bhutadi-sadhana.

History and chronology
The chronology and history of Agama texts is unclear. The surviving Agama texts were likely composed in the 1st millennium CE, likely existed by the 5th century CE. However, scholars such as Ramanan refer to the archaic prosody and linguistic evidence to assert that the beginning of the Agama literature goes back to about 5th century BCE, in the decades after the death of Buddha.

Temple and archaeological inscriptions, as well as textual evidence, suggest that the Agama texts were in existence by the 7th century in the Pallava dynasty era. However, Richard Davis notes that the ancient Agamas "are not necessarily the Agamas that survive in modern times". The texts have gone through revision over time.

See also
 Āgama (Buddhism)
 Jain Agamas (Śvētāmbara)
 Jain Agamas (Digambara)
 Sacred geometry

References

Sources
 

Hindu texts